The gwageo or kwago were the national civil service examinations under the Goryeo and Joseon dynasties of Korea. Typically quite demanding, these tests measured candidates' ability of writing composition and knowledge of the Chinese classics. The form of writing varied from literature to proposals on management of the state. Technical subjects were also tested to appoint experts on medicine, interpretation, accounting, law etc. These were the primary route for most people to achieve positions in the bureaucracy.

Based on the civil service examinations of imperial China, the gwageo first arose in Unified Silla, gained importance in Goryeo, and were the centerpiece of most education in the Joseon dynasty. The tutelage provided at the hyanggyo, seowon, and Sungkyunkwan was aimed primarily at preparing students for the gwageo and their subsequent career in government service. Under Joseon law, high office was closed to those who were not children of officials of the second full rank or higher, unless the candidate had passed the gwageo. Those who passed the higher literary examination came to monopolize all of the dynasty's high positions of state.

Silla
The first national examinations were administered in the kingdom of Silla beginning in 788, after the Confucian scholar Choe Chiwon submitted the Ten Urgent Points of Reform to Queen Jinseong, the ruler of Silla at the time. However, due to Silla's entrenched bone rank system, which dictated that appointments be made on the basis of birth, these examinations did not have a strong effect on the government.

Goryeo
Under the Goryeo dynasty, the national examinations became more systematic and powerful than they had been under Silla. However, they remained only one among several avenues to power. A man who had reached a position of the fifth rank or higher could automatically have one son placed in a position of rank.

The examinations were established in 958, during the reign of Gwangjong as a means of breaking the hold which a few powerful families held over the government. Throughout the dynasty, they retained this character of strengthening the throne against the aristocracy. This also took the form of aligning the throne with the provincial elites, and the kings of Goryeo strove to extend educational opportunities to the local elites throughout the country. In fact, any member of the yangin freeborn class was permitted to take the examination, although the descendants of monks, criminals and cheonmin were excluded. However, over time government-run educational institutions such as the hyanggyo and Gukjagam lost ground to private institutions like the Twelve Assemblies.

The major examinations were literary, and came in two forms: a composition test (jesul eop), and a test of classical knowledge (myeonggyeong eop). These tests were officially to be held every three years, but in practice it was common for them to be held at other times as well. The composition test came to be viewed as more prestigious, and its successful applicants were divided into three grades. On the other hand, successful candidates on the classical examination were not ranked. In the course of the dynasty, some 6000 men passed the composition examination, while only about 450 passed the classics examination.

The classics examination was revised in 1344, under the reign of Chunghye, on the model of the examination system then employed in Yuan Dynasty. The earlier system based directly on the classics was replaced with one based on Neo-Confucian interpretations of the classics.

Military examinations were established briefly under the reign of Yejong, and again in the reign of Gongyang just before the dynasty's fall; however, for most of the dynasty, there was no military examination and thus no educational path to military rank. This may have reflected the relative strength of the military elites during this period.

Miscellaneous examinations (jabeop) were administered in various fields. One among these was Buddhism; monks who passed received a special clerical title, beginning with daeseon, or "monk designate." Separate tests were administered for the Seon and Gyo sects, which dominated the Buddhism of the Goryeo period.

Joseon
Under the Joseon Dynasty (1392-1910), the examinations fell under three broad categories: the literary examinations (mun-gwa: 文科), military examinations (mugwa: 武科), and miscellaneous examinations (japgwa: 雜科) covering topics such as medicine, geography, astronomy, and translation. As other roads to advancement were much more closed than during the Goryeo period, the gwageo became virtually the only pathway to a position of rank.

In theory, anyone other than slaves and lowest class called chunmin (those who worked in despised occupations such as butchers) could take gwageo examinations, but in reality only yangban who had the luxury of spending much of their childhood and early adulthood studying could hope to pass the exam. In the case of literary administration, children of remarried women, concubines, and officials who were dismissed for corruption were excluded from taking the exam. Gwageo examinations were very important not only for an individual but for his family because a yangban family that did not produce a government official for four generations lost their status as yangban.  
   
When writing the examination, candidates had to record the names and positions of their four great-grandfathers. The higher literary examination was restricted to those who either were already in a position of rank, or who had already passed the lower examination. The miscellaneous examinations were looked down upon by the yangban, and were generally restricted to the chungin class of hereditary technical workers. Criteria for the military examination varied, but over time it became open even to members of the lowest class (the cheonmin).

The gwageo provided a basis for various forms of regionalism. Due to the strength of regional factions in Joseon Dynasty politics, scholars from out-of-favor factions often did not bother to take the examination at all. In addition, for much of the dynasty candidates from Hamgyong were forbidden to attempt the gwageo. In the late Joseon Dynasty, an increasing percentage of successful candidates came from the northern province of Pyongan, and the small county of Chŏngju came to produce more successful candidates than any other county.

Administration
The gwageo were originally administered every three years; these regular examinations were known as the singnyeonsi (식년시). However, the singnyeonsi became less important over time, and an increasing percentage of candidates took the gwageo on special occasions. These included the alseongsi (visitation examinations), which were administered when the king visited the Shrine of Confucius at the Seonggyungwan royal academy, the jeunggwangsi (augmented examinations) held during national celebrations, and the byeolsi (special examinations) held on other special occasions. However, these special examinations were usually limited to the literary and military examinations. Over the course of the dynasty, a total of 581 irregular examinations were held, in comparison to 163 of the triennial singneonsi examinations.

The literary and military examinations were administered in three stages: an initial qualifying test (chosi) administered in the provinces, a second examination (hoesi) conducted in the capital (in which the qualifying candidates were selected), and a third examination (jeonsi) in the presence of the king, in which the successful candidates were ranked in order. Each stage was norm-referenced, with a set number of successful applicants. The candidate who received the highest score (jangwon) in the literary examination was given a post of the 6th junior (jong) rank. If the jangwon was already employed in a position of rank, he was raised 4 levels. The candidates with second and third highest scores were given posts of the 7th junior rank. The rest were not guaranteed a post, but had to wait until one became vacant. The miscellaneous examinations had only the first two stages; their candidates were not ranked.

Testing procedures were a frequent flashpoint of controversy, with various factions vying for control of the examination criteria. In particular, the question of whether the first phase of the higher examination should be oral or written became a hot topic of debate in early Joseon.

Literary examinations
The literary examination was divided into a lower and higher examination. In turn, in the lower literary examination some candidates applied for a "classics licentiate" (or saengwon) and others for a "literary licentiate" (or jinsa). After passing these lower examinations (saengjin-gwa), they could proceed to the higher examination. This lower examination may have originated in the entrance examinations for the Gukjagam of Goryeo.

In the lower examination, the literary licentiate tested compositional skill in various forms of Chinese poetry and prose, including shi poetry, fu rhyming prose, piao documentary prose, and ts'e problem-essays. The classics licentiate tested knowledge of the Four Books and Five Classics from an orthodox Neo-Confucian interpretation. From each regular administration of the test, a total of 100 successful candidates were selected for each licentiate. These were drawn from a pool of 600 (for each licentiate), of which 200 were chosen from the capital and 400 were apportioned from the various provinces.

The higher literary examination was administered every three years, and a total of 33 successful candidates were selected from a pool of 240. These 240, in turn, were sent from the Seonggyungwan (50), the capital (40), and the Eight Provinces (the number sent from each province varied, with Hwanghae and Yeongan sending only 10 while Gyeongsang sent 30). Each of the first two of the higher examination was in turn divided into three parts: in the first section, the candidates showed their understanding of the Confucian canon, in the second part they demonstrated their ability to compose in various literary forms, and in the last portion they wrote a problem-essay which was intended to show their political aptitude.

Over the course of the Joseon Dynasty, a total of 14,620 men passed the literary examination. The triennial singneonsi passed roughly 41% of these; the remainder passed in the course of irregular examinations. This proportion shifted over time; as the dynasty progressed, the irregular examinations became increasingly important. This may in part have been because the number of candidates in triennial examinations was fixed, while the number in the irregular examinations was not fixed.

Military examination (Mugwa)

The military examination selected 190 candidates in the first stage, of whom 28 were allowed to pass the second stage. Of these, 70 came from the capital and the remainder from the various provinces, with Gyeongsang contributing 30, Chungcheong and Jeolla contributing 25, and the remaining provinces 10 candidates each.

The military examinations tested a mixture of military and literary skills and knowledge. The first stage of the test was a practical test of various military skills, focused on Korean archery but the second stage, in which the successful applicants were selected, was an oral examination of applicants' knowledge of the Confucian canon and certain classics of military thought. Of importance were Sun Tzu's Art of War, as well as Hanbizi and Wuzi. The third stage, in which the candidates were ranked, was again based on practical military skills. These include horsemanship, and mounted archery. The story of Yi Sunshin failing the Mugwa the first time due to falling off his horse during this phase, at which point he applied a hasty tourniquet using willow branches, and finishing his mounted archery portion is well known.

Miscellaneous examinations
The miscellaneous examinations, or japgwa, were divided into four parts: translation, medicine, natural science (astrology, geography, and others), and recordkeeping. These examinations were overseen by the government office which employed specialists in the field. They were closely connected to the Sahak royal technical academies, which were overseen by the same offices.

In the case of translation, the languages tested were the four in which the Joseon court maintained interpreters: contemporary Chinese, Mongolian, Jurchen/Manchu, and Japanese. This examination was overseen by the Bureau of Interpreters, which maintained interpreters in the capital and in the major border-ports and cities. At the first level, 45 candidates were accepted in spoken Chinese and 4 in each of the other languages; the second level selected 13 successful applicants in Chinese and 2 in each of the other languages.

The medical examination selected 18 finalists, narrowed to 9 successful applicants in the second round. These were then given positions in the Bureau of Medicine, which sent some of them to the palace and others to each provincial division down to the hyeon level.

Those who passed the japgwa were originally given a crimson certificate, the same color obtained by those who passed the literary examination. However, pressure from the yangban eventually changed this color to white, signifying a lower level of achievement and entitling the bearer to a position of lower rank. Those who passed this examination became known as chungin.

Historical change
The gwageo were supplemented in the reign of Jungjong of Joseon (1506-1544), at the suggestion of the high official Jo Gwang-jo. The supplementary examination was called an "examination for the learned and the virtuous" (hyeollanggwa). This was an abbreviated examination, held in the presence of the king. The candidates had to be recommended by their local magistrate as men of the highest integrity.

The gwageo system became increasingly corrupt in the later years of the Joseon Dynasty. Scholars who were unable to pass the examination began to form a class of disaffected yangban; notable among these was early 19th-century rebel leader Hong Gyeong-nae. Many of the later Silhak scholars also turned away from state service.

The gwageo were finally abolished in the Gabo Reforms of 1894, along with legal class discrimination and the old rank system. However, the tradition continues in the form of university entrance examinations and civil service examinations in modern-day South Korea.

See also
Imperial examination
Education in the Joseon Dynasty
History of education
Republic of Korea public service examinations

Notes

Works cited

References

Education in the Joseon dynasty
Goryeo
Korean Confucianism
Imperial examination

ko:과거 제도#한국의 과거